Bahuara may mean either of two villages in Bihar in India:
Bahuara (panchayat in Chhapra district)
Bahuara (Hajipur panchayat)